is a 2015 Fuji TV Japanese television drama, starring Hidetoshi Nishijima and Hideaki Itō in the lead roles. It started airing from 7 October 2015 and the end of airing has not been confirmed.

Storyline
The storyline was based on the novel Mutsu by Yo Kusakabe.
Eisuke Tameyori (Hidetoshi Nishijima) is a middle-aged private practice physician (general practitioner.) He has the ability to diagnose someone's condition just by looking at them. He is also able to recognize people who will commit crimes in the future by looking for certain symptoms, which he calls 'The markers of Criminal Intent'. After meeting Detective Junichiro Hayase (Atsushi Ito), they soon work together to solve cases.

Characters

Eisuke Tameyori
Played by:Hidetoshi Nishijima

Junichiro Hayase
Played by: Atsushi Itō

Yoji Shirakami
Played by: Hideaki Itō

Namiko Takashima
Played by: Anna Ishibashi

Ibara
Played by: Aoi Nakamura

Satomi Minami
Played by: Minami Hamabe

Kazue Inoue
Played by: Miyoko Asada

Minoru Kurume
Played by: Masane Tsukayama

Ikiyoharu Yoko
Played by: Maki Miyamoto

Takeshi Oota
Played by: Toru Baba

Japanese drama television series
Fuji TV dramas